The Strumbellas are a rock band from Lindsay, Ontario, whose music has been described as alternative country, indie rock, farm emo, and gothic folk.

History 

Formed in 2008 in Toronto, Ontario, the band consists of songwriter Simon Ward on vocals and guitar, David Ritter on vocals and keys, Jon Hembrey on lead guitar, Isabel Ritchie on violin, Darryl James on bass guitar, and Jeremy Drury on drums. Hembrey, James, Drury and Ward are all originally from Lindsay, Ontario, while Ritter and Ritchie joined after Ward posted a call for additional musicians to Craigslist.

The band's self-titled EP was released in 2009, garnering numerous positive reviews and coverage in many different media outlets; stating them as a band to watch. Their Southern Souls video by Mitch Fillion received attention from many bloggers and awarded them an ongoing Monday night residency at Toronto's legendary Cameron House.

In 2010 the band was invited to play landmark venues including Yonge-Dundas Square, the Horseshoe Tavern and the Peterborough Folk Festival. Their full-length debut album, My Father and the Hunter, was released independently in 2012, and recorded at Metalworks Studios in Mississauga, Ontario. It was nominated for a 2013 Juno Award in the Juno Award for Roots & Traditional Album of the Year – Group category.

The band later signed with Six Shooter Records, releasing their second album, We Still Move on Dance Floors, in 2013. The album was produced by Ryan Hadlock. We Still Move on Dance Floors won a 2014 Juno Award in the Juno Award for Roots & Traditional Album of the Year – Group category. After winning the Juno award, frontman Simon Ward expressed his distress after realizing that the live feed of the band's acceptance speech was cut off due to technical difficulties.

The band's third studio album, Hope, was released on April 22, 2016. The first single from that album, Spirits, topped the Billboard Alternative Songs chart the last two weeks of May 2016 and also enjoyed significant mainstream radio play in Canada and a number of European countries. On April 21, 2016, the band were featured performers on The Late Show with Stephen Colbert, closing out the episode with a live performance of Spirits. They also performed at the NHL Heritage Classic in Winnipeg during the first intermission on October 23, 2016.

The band began an international tour in the summer of 2016, continuing throughout 2017 in Australia, Europe, and North America including festivals such as Bonnaroo and Governor's Ball.  The band's song "Spirits" won the 2017 Juno Award for Single of the Year.

The band's fourth studio album, Rattlesnake, was released on March 29, 2019. On April 3, 2019, the band performed the album's first single, Salvation, on Late Night with Seth Meyers.

In September 2019, the Liberal Party of Canada adopted the band's song "One Hand Up", which originally appeared on Rattlesnake, as their campaign anthem for Prime Minister Justin Trudeau's campaign. The deal included the band producing another version of the song in French. The French version was believed by some to have been Google Translated from English to French, and while the band did not confirm or deny the report, they did record a new version of the song.

In March 2022, the band announced on Instagram that Ward had transitioned into a behind-the-scenes role in order to focus on his family and songwriting. Jimmy Chauveau replaced Ward as the band's vocalist.

Discography

Albums

EPs
The Strumbellas (2009)

Singles

As lead artist

Promotional singles

Notes

Awards and nominations

See also

Music of Canada
Canadian rock
List of bands from Canada
List of Canadian musicians
:Category:Canadian musical groups

References

External links
 

Musical groups established in 2008
Canadian indie rock groups
Canadian alternative country groups
Musical groups from Ontario
Kawartha Lakes
Musical collectives
Six Shooter Records artists
2008 establishments in Ontario
Juno Award for Single of the Year winners
Juno Award for Roots & Traditional Album of the Year – Group winners
Canadian Folk Music Award winners
Glassnote Records artists